Kick The Fossil Fuel Habit: 10 Clean Technologies to Save Our World is a 2010 book by clean energy venture capitalist Tom Rand. The book is about making an energy transition from fossil fuels to clean technologies, by changing to 100% renewable energy. It includes detailed descriptions of the technologies required – solar energy, wind power, geothermal energy and more. Author Tom Rand says we will "need to deploy resources on a scale not seen since World War II, generate international co-operation, and develop rules to put a price on carbon."

Rand says that there are many reasons to kick the fossil fuel habit: "energy security; the moral cost of supporting undemocratic regimes that sit on the oil we use; the military cost, both in blood and cash, to keep the supply lines open; and getting a leg up on the competition in the next industrial revolution. Each of these is reason enough to kick the habit".

Rand stresses that we need to act quickly and, equally important, collectively. That means "this generation of government, businesses and individuals all need act together to save the world for the next".

See also
The Third Industrial Revolution
The Clean Tech Revolution
List of books about renewable energy
Mark Z. Jacobson

References

2010 non-fiction books
2010 in the environment
Books about energy issues
Energy economics
Renewable energy commercialization
Sustainability books
Climate change books